Alida Impia Maria "Alie" van Leeuwen (13 August 1908 – 23 October 1991) was a Dutch diver. She competed in two events at the 1928 Summer Olympics.

References

External links 
 

1908 births
1991 deaths
Dutch female divers
Olympic divers of the Netherlands
Divers at the 1928 Summer Olympics
Divers from Amsterdam
20th-century Dutch women